Unedogemmula koolhoveni is a species of sea snail, a marine gastropod mollusk in the family Turridae, the turrids.

Taxonomy
The species was transferred to Unedogemmula by Powell (1964). Later it was found alive and transferred to Lophiotoma by Li & Li (2008) who synonimized Unedogemmula with Lophiotoma.

Description
The length of the shell attains 40.2 mm.

Distribution
Fossils of this marine species were found in Miocene strata in Okinawa and Pliocene strata on Java, Indonesia.

References

 Oostingh C.H. (1938-1940). Die Mollusken des Pliocäns von Süd-Bantam in Java. De Ingenieur in Nederlandsch Indië, IV. Mijnbouw en Geologie. (Die Mijningenieur). 5(2): 17-33, pls 1-7 [
  Li B. [Baoquan] & Li X. [Xinzheng]. (2008). Report on the turrid genera Gemmula, Lophiotoma and Ptychosyrinx (Gastropoda: Turridae: Turrinae) from the China seas. Zootaxa. 1778: 1-25.

External links
  Powell, A.W.B. (1964). The family Turridae in the Indo-Pacific. Part 1. The subfamily Turrinae. Indo-Pacific Mollusca. 1 (5): 227-346; 1 (7): 409-454

koolhoveni
Gastropods described in 1938